The Hellenic Sailing Federation is the national governing body for the sport of sailing in Greece, recognised by the International Sailing Federation.

Notable sailors
See :Category:Greek sailors

Olympic sailing
See :Category:Olympic sailors of Greece

Offshore sailing
See :Category:Greek sailors (sport)

Yacht Clubs
See :Category:Yacht clubs in Greece

References

External links
 Official website
 ISAF MNA Microsite

Greece
Sailing
Sailing in Greece
1951 establishments in Greece